The Friends Provident Trophy was a one-day cricket competition in the United Kingdom.

It was one of the four tournaments in which the eighteen first-class counties competed each season. They were joined by teams from Scotland and Ireland. Lancashire won the title a record seven times.

The competition has previously been known as the C&G Trophy (2000–2006), the NatWest Trophy (1981–2000) and the Gillette Cup (1963–1980). For a short period following the 2006 season, the competition was known as the ECB One-Day Trophy because no sponsors were forthcoming when Cheltenham and Gloucester decided to end their association with the competition after the 2006 season. The tournament, along with the Pro40 forty-overs competition, was replaced by the ECB 40 competition from the 2010 season.

History

It was the first top level one day competition to be introduced in English and Welsh cricket, amid concern about falling attendances at County Championship matches in the early 1960s.

The competition was based on the Midlands Counties Knockout Cup experiment of 1962, when Derbyshire, Leicestershire, Northamptonshire and Nottinghamshire played one-innings-a-side matches which each lasted one day. The MCC decided to hold a limited over competition (65 overs-a-side) the following year for all first-class counties sponsored by American safety razor company Gillette. The original title was "The First Class Knock Out Competition for the Gillette Cup".

The first match (which was also retrospectively identified as the first List A cricket match after that designation was developed), was a Preliminary Round match on 1 May 1963 at Old Trafford, Manchester with Lancashire facing Leicestershire. The match ended up lasting two days due to rain. Peter Marner scored the first century and Brian Statham was the first bowler to take 5 wickets in a match.

Sussex were the first winners of the Gillette Cup, beating Worcestershire in the final at Lord's. Norman Gifford was the very first "Man of the Match" for a final.

Knock-out competition

In the inaugural season the matches were 65 overs per side, with a bowler bowling a maximum of 15 overs. In 1964, this was reduced to 60 overs with a bowler bowling a maximum of 13. For the 1966 competition until 1998 the maximum was 12.

Minor Counties teams first competed in the 1964 season.  The competition has been seen as a cricketing version of football's FA Cup (it being said 
that "the B&H was always the League Cup final to the Gillette/NatWest's FA Cup"), with Minor Counties, Ireland and Scotland playing against the First Class Counties in the first round. Most times the established teams beat the part-timers but very occasionally there was some "giant killing". Between 1963 and 2005 there were 15 "upsets", including: Durham (at that time still a minor county) being the first in 1973 v Yorkshire; Hertfordshire being successful on two occasions, beating Essex in 1976, and winning a bowl-out versus Derbyshire in 1991; and Herefordshire overcoming a Middlesex side featuring Andrew Strauss in 2001. However, the majority of the time it was an opportunity for county sides to score very high scores against or bowl out cheaply Minor Counties opposition.

One of the most famous matches in the competition was the 1971 Gillette Cup semi final at Old Trafford, with David Hughes of Lancashire coming out to bat at 8.45 pm (before any floodlights) and scoring 24 in one over to beat Gloucestershire. That Lancashire team won the tournament three seasons in a row from 1970 to 1972.

In June 1973, Durham became the first minor county to defeat a first class county in the competition, when they beat Yorkshire by six wickets in round one. They then became the first minor county to defeat two first class counties, when they defeated Derbyshire at the same stage in 1985. This was the catalyst for the successful campaign that saw Durham gain first class status in 1991.

In 1981, the National Westminster Bank took over the sponsorship of the competition from Gillette. That year's final finished in a tie, with both sides scored 235. Derbyshire claiming the trophy from Northamptonshire by losing fewer wickets (Derbyshire 6 to Northants 9).

Other last ball finishes in the final occurred in 1984 when Middlesex beat Kent, in 1985 when Essex beat Nottinghamshire, and in 1993 when Warwickshire beat Sussex. There was a notable finish too in 1987 when Nottinghamshire's unlikely victory over Northamptonshire was engineered by Richard Hadlee in his last season with the county.

The tournament was always the more prestigious of the two "full length" one day cup competitions. The other was the Benson & Hedges Cup, which was abolished in 2002 and replaced with the Twenty20 Cup.  At a time when county cricketers' exposure on television was limited, the final of the Gillette Cup/NatWest Bank Trophy was a relatively high-profile opportunity for some to make a case for national selection, especially as it often fell in early September, just before the announcement of an England winter tour party. Thus strong performances by Roland Butcher in the 1980 final, and Geoff Cook in 1981, may have assisted their subsequent selection and Test debuts. The strong performances of then young cricketers Angus Fraser and Mark Ramprakash for Middlesex in 1988 certainly raised their profiles. Conversely surprise was expressed in 1990 when Phillip DeFreitas was initially overlooked for selection for the winter Ashes series, it being suggested at the time that he "surely booked his place on England's winter tour of Australia with an astonishing eight-over opening burst, which reduced Northants to an unbelievable 39 for five" in the final.

Other notable individual performances included a brisk out-of-character century by Geoff Boycott in the 1965 final, and the domination of the 1979 final by the West Indies pair Viv Richards and Joel Garner, who helped Somerset to their first major trophy a few months after helping West Indies to win the World Cup, also at Lord's. Another West Indies international, Alvin Kallicharran, completed the first double century in the tournament in 1984, in a tie in which he remarkably also took six wickets.

The necessity of aiming to complete a scheduled 120 overs in a day (130 when the tournament began) necessitated some early starts. End of season early-morning conditions by the time of the final often favoured the team fielding first, who usually triumphed in the 1980s and 1990s.  A rare exception occurred in 1996, when Lancashire bowlers Glen Chapple and Peter Martin triggered a remarkable collapse by Essex.
 
In 1999 the number of overs was cut to 50 per side to give English and Welsh cricketers more experience of playing matches the same length as One Day Internationals. In line with One Day International cricket, teams played in coloured clothing from 2005.

League from 2006

The competition was revised into a league format from 2006. The eighteen English and Welsh first-class sides, plus Scotland and Ireland, were split into two groups of ten by geographical location known as the North and South Conferences. Matches were 50 overs per side, gaining two points for a win, one point for a no result and no points for a loss. Once the league positions were decided, the top teams from each Conference competed for the trophy in a final at Lord's. In the 2007 season this involved a semi-final knock-out stage, the winner in each conference playing the runners-up in the other.

The league structure was revised in 2008 as the twenty teams were split into four groups of five. Each team plays the other in the group home once and away once, with the top 2 counties in the group going into the quarter finals.

The competition was played in the first half of the cricket season with the final taking place in August. The other main domestic one-day competition, the Natwest Pro40 League (formerly "Sunday League"), was latterly played during the second half of the season.

In August 2009, the ECB announced that from 2010 there would be one 40-overs per innings tournament replacing both the Pro40 and the Friends Provident Trophy. This along with the English County Championship and the Friends Provident t20 (a revised form of the Twenty20 Cup), would be English cricket's three domestic competitions.

Final results 

Gillette Cup

NatWest Trophy

C&G Trophy

Friends Provident Trophy

Wins by county 1963–2009 
 7 wins: Lancashire
 5 wins: Gloucestershire; Sussex; Warwickshire
 4 wins: Middlesex
 3 wins: Somerset; Yorkshire; Essex; Hampshire
 2 wins: Kent; Northamptonshire
 1 win: Derbyshire; Durham; Nottinghamshire; Surrey; Worcestershire

First class counties with no wins: Glamorgan and Leicestershire

See also 
 County Championship – the first class cricket competition in England and Wales.
 Pro40 – the one day league competition.
 Twenty20 Cup – the Twenty20 format competition.

References 

 Gillette Cup / NatWest Trophy / C&G Trophy 1963–2004, Cricinfo, retrieved 19 November 2006.
 Friends Provident back Trophy, ECB media release, retrieved 8 February 2007

External links 
 Caught in Time: Lancashire win the Gillette Cup, 1975 – The Sunday Times, July 16 2006
 Friends Provident Trophy website
 ECB Friends Provident Trophy website
 Last chance for the giant-killers – BBC Sport 30 April 2005

 
English domestic cricket competitions
Sports leagues established in 1963
Recurring sporting events established in 1963
Recurring sporting events disestablished in 2009
List A cricket competitions
NatWest Group